Moayad Omar Suleiman Abu Keshek is a Jordanian football coach and former player who is the head coach of Shabab Al Ubeidiya. He played as a forward for the Jordan national team.

Career statistics

International

References

 Al-Faisaly (Amman) Allow its Player Abu Keshek to Move Out on Loan With Al-Jazeera (Amman)
 Abu Keshek Takes Professionalism in Jabal Al-Mukaber After Terminating His Contract With Al-Faisaly (Amman)
 Mo'ayyad Abu Keshek Officially Signs Up for Shabab Al-Ordon
 Shabab Al-Ordon Agrees to Terminate the Contract of Abu Keshek 
 Mo'ayyad Abu Keshek Transfers to Fanja SC of Oman

External links
 
 
 
 

1982 births
Living people
Jordanian footballers
Association football midfielders
Al-Baqa'a Club players
Al-Faisaly SC players
Al-Nasr SC (Kuwait) players
Al-Jazeera (Jordan) players
Jabal Al-Mukaber Club players
Shabab Al-Ordon Club players
Fanja SC players
Shabab Al-Khader SC players
Jordanian Pro League players
Kuwait Premier League players
Oman Professional League players
West Bank Premier League players
Jordan international footballers
2011 AFC Asian Cup players
Jordanian expatriate footballers
Jordanian expatriate sportspeople in Kuwait
Jordanian expatriate sportspeople in the State of Palestine
Jordanian expatriate sportspeople in Oman
Expatriate footballers in Kuwait
Expatriate footballers in the State of Palestine
Expatriate footballers in Oman
Jordanian football managers
Jordanian expatriate football managers
Expatriate football managers in the State of Palestine